Anthophila filipjevi is a moth in the family Choreutidae. It was described by Aleksandr Sergeievich Danilevsky in 1969. It is found in Russia (Central Siberia, Irkutsk, Lake Baikal, Bagan-Ogly, Uyuk region).

References

Choreutidae
Moths described in 1969